Rebecca Costa may refer to:

 Rebecca D. Costa (born 1955), American futurist and sociobiologist
 Rebecca Da Costa (born 1984), Brazilian actress and model